The Boehm, later Boehm-Boteler Baronetcy, of Wetherby Gardens in the Parish of St Mary Abbots, Kensington, in the County of London, was a title in the Baronetage of the United Kingdom. It was created on 13 July 1889 for the sculptor Joseph Boehm. His son, the second Baronet, assumed by deed poll the additional surname of Boteler in 1918, which was that of his mother. The title became extinct on the second Baronet's death in 1928.

Boehm, later Boehm-Boteler baronets, of Wetherby Gardens (1889)
Sir Joseph Edgar Boehm, 1st Baronet (1834–1890)
Sir Edgar Collins Boehm-Boteler, 2nd Baronet (1869–1928)

References

Extinct baronetcies in the Baronetage of the United Kingdom